Francis Asbury Roe (October 4, 1823 – December 28, 1901) was an admiral in the United States Navy who served during the American Civil War.

Biography
Born in Elmira, New York, Roe entered the United States Navy as a midshipman on October 19, 1841, and graduated from the United States Naval Academy in Annapolis, Maryland in 1848.

Roe left the Navy for eleven months, from June 1848 to May 1849, serving aboard the mail steamer SS Georgia.

After he returned to the Navy, he was assigned to the brigantine  and served in an expedition to chart the North Pacific. Cape Roe on the Japanese island of Tanegashima was named for him during this expedition. In 1854, while serving in Porpoise on the Asiatic Station, he participated in an engagement with 13 Chinese armored junks off Macau. Six of the junks were sunk and the others were scattered.

Roe received his commission as master on August 8, 1855, and as lieutenant on September 14 of the same year. From 1857 to 1858 he served in the U.S. Coast Survey.

During the Civil War, in April 1862, he was recommended for promotion for gallantry for his actions on board the screw steamer  while serving as executive officer, as that ship led Admiral David Farragut's starboard column past Fort Jackson and Fort St. Philip. He was promoted to lieutenant commander on July 16, 1862, and placed in command of the  gunboat  on the Mississippi River. While commanding Katahdin, Roe defeated Confederate general John C. Breckinridge's attack on Baton Rouge, Louisiana.

Roe was ordered to command the side-wheel steamer  on the North Atlantic Blockading Squadron in September 1863, and captured and destroyed several blockade runners in the sounds of North Carolina. Eight months later he was again commended for gallantry for engaging the Confederate ram  and capturing the gunboat  on May 5, 1864.

After the end of the war, Roe commanded the iron-hulled warship  on the Great Lakes. He was promoted to commander on July 25, 1866, and given command of the steamer  on a special mission to Mexico. Roe served as fleet captain for the Asiatic Station from 1868 to 1871.

Roe was promoted to captain on April 1, 1872, and commanded the screw sloop  on the Brazil Station from 1874 to 1875. He was promoted to commodore on November 26, 1880, and to rear admiral on November 3, 1884, while serving as governor of the Naval Asylum at Philadelphia, Pennsylvania. He was transferred to the retired list on October 4, 1885.

Roe died in Washington, D.C., on December 28, 1901, aged 78, and is buried in Arlington National Cemetery.

Namesake
The United States Navy has named two destroyers  in his honor.

Gallery

References

Further reading
 Park Benjamin, Jr., Francis Asbury Roe (Washington, 1904)

External links
 F. A. Roe Scrapbook, 1862–1891 MS 189 held by Special Collections & Archives, Nimitz Library at the United States Naval Academy

Union Navy officers
1823 births
1901 deaths
People from Elmira, New York
United States Navy admirals
United States Naval Academy alumni
Burials at Arlington National Cemetery
General Society of Colonial Wars